Maigatari is a border town located in the Sahel along the Niger-Nigeria border. The town is known for its large market founded in 1870 and trading in horses, camels, cattle and other livestock between Niger, Mali, Chad and Cameroon.

The principal inhabitants of the town include Hausa, Fulani and Kanuri. The town has an area of 870 km and a population of 179,715 at the 2006 census.

Administration 
Local Government Area in the north of Jigawa State, Nigeria, bordering on the Republic of Niger. Its headquarters are in the town of Maigatari. The postal code of the area is 732.

References

Local Government Areas in Jigawa State